Takamoto Katsuta (勝田 貴元, Katsuta Takamoto, born 17 March 1993) is a Japanese rally driver. He currently rallies for the Toyota Gazoo Racing WRT NG in the World Rally Championship. He rose to prominence after taking a surprise victory in the WRC-2 class at the 2018 Rally Sweden. He achieved his first World Rally Championship podium in 2021 Safari Rally, scoring second place.

Early career
Katsuta was born in Nagoya. He began karting at the age of 12. Following intermediate success in this category, he began racing in the Formula Challenge Japan series in 2010, and eventually became champion in 2011, aged 18.

2012–2014: Years in Formula 3
Seeing the successes Katsuta had in Formula Challenge Japan, the TOM'S team hired him to be one of their drivers for the Japanese Formula 3 Championship in 2012, racing in the National class. He finished third in this category overall, and was eventually promoted to full championship driver for 2013. Katsuta experienced great success in 2013, winning two races and finishing second in the overall championship, beating drivers from the likes of Katsumasa Chiyo and future member of the McLaren Young Driver Programme, Nobuharu Matsushita. The following season, 2014, would be Katsuta's last in Formula 3. He ended up under-performing, finishing 4th in the standings with another two victories.

Taking an interest in rallying
During his final year of Japanese Formula 3, Katsuta began rallying at the local level. He began with a Toyota GT86 in the JN-5 class of the Japan Rally Championship (a series his father, Norihiko, has won eight times). In his second event, the Rally Highland Masters, Takamoto won his class, finishing 10th overall. His eventual goal was to be picked up by Toyota's development driver program. His performances in Japan attracted the attention of four-time World Rally Champion and future Toyota Gazoo Racing WRT team boss Tommi Mäkinen, who signed him onto Toyota's program alongside Hiroki Arai.

Rallying career

2015–2016: early years with Mäkinen
At the start of his campaign with Mäkinen and Toyota, Katsuta would participate in selected rallies while practicing full-time in Finland, under Mäkinen's supervision. Katsuta's first rallies with Tommi Mäkinen Racing were in local Finnish and Latvian events, driving a Subaru Impreza WRX. Beginning in 2016, Katsuta would be rallying with a very experienced co-driver, Daniel Barritt. Katsuta experienced intermediate success in local Finnish rallies, before being supplied with a Ford Fiesta R5 for the Rally Estonia, his first major long-distance rally in FIA-homologated 4-wheel drive machinery. This was also his first start in the European Rally Championship. He failed to finish the event after crashing in the second leg. Despite this, Mäkinen promoted Katsuta and Hiroki Arai to their first World Rally Championship start at Finland, rallying in the WRC-2 Class. Katsuta would finish 12th in class, sixteen minutes behind the class winner.

2017: full-time WRC program
Beginning in 2017, Katsuta would be participating in a full-season World Rally Championship program in the WRC-2 category, alongside Hiroki Arai. Katsuta would also be rallying in local rallies outside of Finland. He partnered Marko Salminen for this season. Successes for the two drivers were few and far between, but Katsuta would make a name for himself upon taking a class podium at the Rally Italia Sardegna.

2018: victory and increased support from Toyota

After his breakout onto the international scene in 2017, Katsuta would begin to enjoy more successes in 2018. He began with a 3rd-place overall finish at the Arctic Lapland Rally, one of the biggest local rallies in Finland. Then at the Rally Sweden, after winning 10 of the 19 special stages, Katsuta won the World Rally Championship-2 class, finishing 11th overall. He won by just 4.5 seconds from Škoda factory driver and then-reigning WRC-2 champion Pontus Tidemand. After this surprise success, Katsuta and team-mate Hiroki Arai continued to rally in the European WRC events, albeit without reaching the level of success achieved at Sweden.

2019: World Rally Car debut
Towards the end of the 2018 season, Toyota announced their intentions to eventually run Katsuta in a World Rally Car potentially by 2020. He spent 2019 competing in the WRC-2 class with Tommi Mäkinen Racing. After two seasons with Elfyn Evans, Daniel Barritt returned to be Katsuta's co-driver. Katsuta's first outing with a Toyota Yaris WRC was at the SM-Itäralli, a round of the Finnish championship, in which he would impress with a victory.

Racing record

Circuit racing career summary

Complete World Rally Championship Results
 
* Season still in progress.

Complete World Rally Championship-2 Results

References

External links

 Takamoto Katsuta's Twitter page
 Katsuta's Facebook page

1993 births
Living people
European Rally Championship drivers
Japanese racing drivers
Japanese rally drivers
World Rally Championship drivers
Japanese expatriate sportspeople in Finland
Karting World Championship drivers
Toyota Gazoo Racing drivers
Japanese Formula 3 Championship drivers
TOM'S drivers
Formula Challenge Japan drivers